The 5th British Academy Film Awards, retroactively known as the British Academy Film Awards, given by the British Academy of Film and Television Arts (BAFTA) (previously the British Film Academy) in 1952, honoured the best films of 1951. La Ronde won the award for Best Film''.

Winners and nominees
Winners are listed first and highlighted in boldface; the nominees are listed below alphabetically and not in boldface.

References

Film005
1952 in British cinema
1951 film awards
May 1952 events in the United Kingdom
1952 in London